East Hebron is an unincorporated community in the town of Hebron in Grafton County, New Hampshire.

It is located along New Hampshire Route 3A on the east side of Newfound Lake.  Route 3A connects Bristol to the south with Plymouth to the north.

East Hebron has a separate ZIP code (03232) from the rest of the town of Hebron.

References

Unincorporated communities in New Hampshire
Unincorporated communities in Grafton County, New Hampshire
Hebron, New Hampshire